Valery Nikolayevich Ivanov (born 1948) was a Soviet diplomat.

As First Secretary of the Soviet Embassy to Australia, he was expelled on 22 April 1983 under suspicion of being a spy after allegedly trying to recruit Australian Labor Party member David Combe, see Combe-Ivanov affair.

References

1948 births
Soviet diplomats
KGB officers
Living people
Combe–Ivanov affair